Alex Hacker may refer to:

Alex Hacker, character in List of Sanford and Son episodes
Alex Hacker, character in The Ambassador (1984 American film)